Milton Blanco (born April 27, 1984) is an American former soccer player who is currently an assistant coach for Central Valley Fuego FC in USL League One.

Career
A veteran leader for the Fuego, Blanco has had professional stints with USL Second Division Harrisburg City Islanders as well as Chivas USA of MLS. Blanco is the 2nd Fuego player to receive this award joining former Fuego star Pablo Campos, the 2007 winner.

Blanco played college soccer at Fresno Pacific University.

Personal
Blanco is of Salvadoran heritage, but born in the United States. He carries both a Mexico and USA passport.

His mother abandoned the home when Milton was a toddler and his father, Santos Antonio "Tony" Blanco, was shot and killed in Fresno in 1995.

Honors
  2011 North American USL PDL MVP
  2011 PDL All-Star XI
  2011 USL PDL All Western Conference Team
  2011 USL PDL Scoring Champion (Goals/Assist)
  2011 PDL Assist Champion
  2011 Team MVP and Scoring Leader (Voted by Players)

References

External links
 

1984 births
Living people
American sportspeople of Salvadoran descent
American soccer players
Association football midfielders
Atlanta Silverbacks players
Austin Aztex U23 players
Charlotte Eagles players
Chivas USA players
FC Edmonton players
Fresno Fuego players
Fresno Pacific Sunbirds men's soccer players
Major League Soccer players
North American Soccer League players
Orange County SC players
Penn FC players
Phoenix Rising FC players
Puerto Rico Islanders players
Soccer players from California
Sportspeople from Fresno, California
USL Championship players
USL First Division players
USL League Two players
USL Second Division players
American soccer coaches
USL League One coaches
Central Valley Fuego FC